Backward flying, also known as reverse flying, is a locomotive phenomenon where the object flies in the opposite of its intended flight direction.

Different fields

Biology
In nature, there are very few organisms who can fly in such manner, making the phenomenon very rare. In the class Aves (birds), there is only one family, Trochilidae (hummingbirds) where the backward flying phenomenon can be found. In the class Insecta (insects), in the infraorder Anisoptera (dragonflies), genus Hemaris (bee hawk-moths) and order Diptera (true flies), species with this ability can be also found.

There are also some species that don't use the traditional wing flapping mechanism to fly backwards. One such example is the Japanese flying squid, which uses a jet propulsion mechanism for backward flying.

Technology
In technology, there are some aircraft that can fly backwards. One example is helicopters.

Efficiency
There is no difference in the efficiency between forward flying and backward flying. Although, it was originally thought that backward flying would be much less efficient.

Similar phenomena
Similar to backward flying, backward gliding phenomenon also exists in nature. An example of organism that can backward glide is cephalotes atratus ("non-specific turtle ant").

Notes

References

Flight